Geoffrey David O'Connor is an Australian indie pop musician and producer based in Melbourne. He released his debut studio album Liquorice Night in 2007, under the alias of Sly Hats. O'Connor has since released the solo albums, Vanity Is Forever (2011) Fan Fiction (2014) and For as Long as I Can Remember all through Chapter Music.

O'Connor is also a member of indie pop group The Crayon Fields, on lead guitar and lead vocals.

Career
O'Connor produced Vanity Is Forever, which Triple J's Zan Rowe described as "a distinct step away from the indie-pop of his band. The record is full of synthesisers, and modern soft rock sounds and is written from the perspective of a guy who has both a heavy heart and a high libido". At the time of release, Geoffrey toured the US on a sold-out support tour with Jens Lekman, toured Australia as part of the Laneway Festival, and supported Grimes, Edwyn Collins and Pains of Being Pure at Heart on their Australian tours. 

O'Connor's solo album Fan Fiction was released in August 2014 through Chapter Music. Pitchfork's Jake Cleland gave it a score of 7.4, describing it as an album in which "every dazzling melody is sandwiched together, maximalist and swollen in a dizzying spectacle".

In August 2021, O'Connor released his first solo album in seven years. For as Long as I Can Remember is a suite of duets with fellow Australia singers.

In April 2023, O'Conner is scheduled to release an EP featuring remixes of songs from his 2021 album, For as Long as I Can Remember.

Discography

Albums

Awards and nominations

EG Awards / Music Victoria Awards
The EG Awards (known as Music Victoria Awards since 2013) are an annual awards night celebrating Victorian music. They commenced in 2006.

! 
|-
| 2012
| Geoffrey O'Connor
| Best Male
| 
| 
|-
|rowspan="2"| 2021
| "For As Long As I Can Remember" (with Jonnine)
| Best Victorian Song
| 
|rowspan="2"| 
|-
| Geoffrey O'Connor
| Best Pop Act
|

References

Year of birth missing (living people)
Living people
Australian musicians
Australian record producers